Falco: The Official Companion is a 2010 book by English writer Lindsey Davis, which accompanies her 20 historical crime novels about Marcus Didius Falco, a private eye in Ancient Rome. It was published by Century, .

Davis says in the introduction:

The book is not an A-Z guide but a thematic account of many aspects of the background to the series, with sections including: "Falco's relatives", "Lindsey's favourite Roman places", "Praetorians, Urbans and Vigils", "Roman names: the trianomina" and "Where next for Falco?".

References

External links
Falco: The Official Companion on Lindsey Davis' personal website

 
History books about ancient Rome